Robin Parry is a Christian theologian particularly known for advocating Christian universalism. His best known book is The Evangelical Universalist, which he wrote under the pseudonym Gregory MacDonald because he had not at the time publicly expressed his belief in universalism.

Early career
Parry completed his PhD on Genesis 34 under the supervision of Gordon J. Wenham and Craig Bartholomew at the University of Gloucestershire. He was a sixth form college teacher in Worcester, UK, for eleven years, before starting work in publishing in 2001 for Paternoster Press and, since 2010, for Wipf & Stock Publishers.

Interviews
After Parry's book Worshipping Trinity was published, Grace Communion International had an extensive interview with him on "the importance of having a trinitarian perspective in our worship".

Due to the controversial nature of his book "The Evangelical Universalist," Parry has appeared twice as a guest on Premier Christian Radio. He was also interviewed in "Hellbound?", the movie documentary, and in numerous online podcasts and blogs.

Works

References

External links
 Theological Scribbles Blog
 The Evangelical Universalist Forum

Year of birth missing (living people)
Living people
British Christian universalists
21st-century Christian universalists
Christian universalist theologians